Bajram Curri (16 January 1862 – 29 March 1925) was an Albanian chieftain, politician and activist who struggled for the independence of Albania, later struggling for Kosovo's incorporation into it following the 1913 Treaty of London. He was posthumously given the title Hero of Albania.

Early life 
Bajram Curri was born in 1862 or 1866 in Rahovec. Most of the sources place year of birth as 1862, while more recent sources based on his recently discovered passport state 1866. His family originated in Krasniqi (present Tropojë), in the Highlands of Gjakova. At his birth, the Curri family was led to the Ottoman prison in Krushë e Madhe, Rahovec; his father Shaqir Aga had led a rebellion in Krasniq against the Ottomans due to heavy taxes and military recruitment, and had been interned by them. Shaqir Aga Curri was a trusted man of Abdullah Pasha Dreni of Gjakova, and apparently had become instrumental in tax-collection procedures and punishing expeditions of Pasha Dreni in the area. He aided Pasha Dreni during the Attack against Mehmed Ali Pasha, and was killed in the skirmish by the forces of the League of Prizren.

Career
Whilst the present-day regions of Albania were under Ottoman control, Curri represented the interests of the Albanians.

Between 1885-1886, he got into a feud with Riza Bey Gjakova that lasted for a decade and was only ended through an envoy sent by the sultan who conferred upon each man a military command and rank with Curri becoming a captain of the gendarmerie in Pristina. To govern, Sultan Abdulhamid II used patronage networks by awarding privileges and government positions to co opt local leaders such as Curri into the Ottoman system. In 1893 he participated in a revolt in Kosovo led by Haxhi Zeka, which was quickly suppressed by the Ottoman army. During 1899 he became a founding member of Zeka's League of Peja. In 1906 he became one of the founders of the Gjakovë branch of the Secret Committee for the Liberation of Albania (Bashkimi Society) and an influential member.

Like some educated Albanians with nationalist sentiments of the time, Curri supported the unity of Albanians from different religions under the banner of Skanderbeg and was in favour of government reforms that benefited Albanians. During the Young Turk Revolution, Galib Bey managed to get Albanian leaders Curri, Nexhip Draga and Ferhat Draga to attend a meeting at Firzovik (modern Ferizaj) and use their influence to sway the crowd through fears of "foreign intervention" to support constitutional restoration. During the 31 March Incident, among the 15,000 volunteers assisting the larger Ottoman army, Curri, along with Çerçiz Topulli, mobilized 8,000 Albanians to put down the revolt in Istanbul. The repressive activities and broken promises of the Young Turks, however, led Curri to resume militant activities against the Ottoman authorities. In 1912, due to the deteriorating situation between Albanians and Ottoman authorities, Curri alongside other Albanian leaders were present at a meeting in Junik on 20 May where a besa (pledge) was given to wage war on the Young Turk government.  He had an active role in the Albanian Revolt of 1912, fighting alongside Hasan Prishtina, Isa Boletini, Themistokli Gërmenji and others against the Turks. He was also one of the leaders in the Battle of Lumë against the Serbian military, which delayed their expansion to Albania and secured the Albanian independence. On August 18, the moderate faction led by Prishtina managed to convince Curri, and other leaders Idriz Seferi, Riza Bey Gjakova and Isa Boletini of the conservative group to accept the agreement with the Ottomans for Albanian sociopolitical and cultural rights. He successfully fought in 1912 against the Young Turks. During the 1912 uprising, while waiting for an Ottoman response to the demands of the rebels, Curri and other leaders of the rebellion ordered their forces to advance toward Üsküb (modern Skopje) which was captured during August 12–15.

During World War I, he organized a guerrilla unit as part of the Kachak movement through the Committee for the National Defence of Kosovo which he was a member. On 20 October 1914, 1,000 Albanians, led by Bajram Curri, Isa Boletini, Bulgarian komitadjis and Austro-Hungarian officers, attacked a Montenegrin base near Gjakova, and took two hill artillery pieces with them. The Montenegrin army then surrounded and defeated them, and pushed them into Albanian territory.

In 1915 he became a founding member of the Committee for the National Defence of Kosovo. This organization later established relations with the Comintern (which gave support for the self-determination of nations), with Curri later saying in December 1921 to the Soviet minister in Vienna that, "The Albanian people await impatiently the determination of their frontiers not on the basis of brutal and bloody historical considerations, but rather on the basis of the situation which actually exists today. With the firm conviction that Soviet Russia will be able in the near future to determine the boundaries of Europe, especially in the Balkans, in a just manner, I pray that the great Soviet government will grant our just requests at that time."

Following the Congress of Lushnja in 1920 he became a minister without portfolio in the Albanian cabinet. In Albania's politics he identified himself with the left-wing forces of Fan Noli against Ahmet Zogu. In December 1921 he became Minister of War in the unstable government of Hasan Prishtina, replacing Zogu. Within days, however, Zogu assembled his fellow Mati tribesmen and overthrew the government, forcing Prishtina, Curri and others to flee northwards. In March 1922 Curri and Prishtina began a revolt against Zogu which failed. The revolt was crushed, 8 March 1922,  by the  captain Prenk Pervizi,  owing to the efforts of the British ambassador to Albania, Harry Eyres, who convinced one of the rebel commanders to surrender. Two years later, having stayed in the meantime in the mountains in order to evade Zogist forces, he issued the call to arms which began the Bourgeois-Democratic Revolution of June 1924 against Zogu.

Following the defeat of the revolution Curri continued his opposition to Zogu. On March 29, 1925 he was surrounded by Zogist troops while hiding in a cave near Dragobia. He was killed by his own friends so their lives could be spared by the zogist troops.

Years later in honour of Bajram Curri the town of Kolgecaj was renamed after him in 1952.

References

1862 births
1925 deaths
Military personnel from Gjakova
Albanian revolutionaries
Kosovo Albanians
Kosovan soldiers
Heroes of Albania
19th-century Albanian people
20th-century Albanian people
Government ministers of Albania
Defence ministers of Albania
Ministers without portfolio of Albania
Albanian nationalists
19th-century Albanian military personnel
Members of the Parliament of Albania
Politicians from Gjakova